Joanne Brown (born 7 April 1972 in Canberra) is a former softball catcher and outfielder from Australia, who won a bronze medal at the 1996 Summer Olympics and 2000 Summer Olympics.

She was inducted into the Softball Australia Hall of Fame in 2004 and the International Softball Federation Hall of Fame in 2005.

She played for the UCLA Bruins from 1991 -1993 and was a 1992 NCAA All American playing for the UCLA Bruins who won the 1992 NCAA Softball title.

She has played 244 games for the Australian National Softball Team since her debut in 1990.

Her famous walk-off homerun against the U.S. team in an Olympic preliminary round in the 1996 Olympics garnered the attention of numerous softball executives in the United States. She was offered a contract for the inaugural season of WPF and played in 18 games for the Durham Dragons before returning to Australia.

References

1972 births
Living people
Australian Institute of Sport softball players
Australian softball players
Olympic softball players of Australia
Softball players at the 1996 Summer Olympics
Softball players at the 2000 Summer Olympics
Olympic bronze medalists for Australia
Sportspeople from Canberra
Olympic medalists in softball
ACT Academy of Sport alumni
Medalists at the 2000 Summer Olympics
Medalists at the 1996 Summer Olympics